Club Sport Marítimo B is a Portuguese football club that currently plays in the Campeonato de Portugal. They are the reserve team of Club Sport Marítimo. They play their home games at the Campo da Imaculada Conceição in the suburb of Santo António in Funchal, Madeira.

Established in 1999, the squad is the reserve team for the first team, who compete in the top-tier and, as such, they are restricted from promotion to the Primeira Liga, the top-tier professional league, nor are they allowed to compete in the Cup of Portugal and League Cup either. Players from the first team can be dropped down to the B team though as has happened on many occasions, and vice versa.

Current squad

External links
LPFP profile

C.S. Marítimo
Maritimo
Sport in Madeira
Association football clubs established in 1999
1999 establishments in Portugal
Portuguese reserve football teams
Liga Portugal 2 clubs